Grecescu is a Romanian surname that may refer to:

Constantin Grecescu (1929–1996), Romanian long-distance runner
Dimitrie Grecescu (1841–1910), Romanian botanist, physician, and historiographer
Florica Grecescu (born 1932), Romanian middle-distance runner

See Also
 Grecescu Church,is a Romanian Orthodox church

Romanian-language surnames